Martin Behrman (October 14, 1864 – January 12, 1926), an American Democratic politician, was the longest-serving mayor in New Orleans history.

Life and career
Behrman was born in New York City, the son of Frederica and Henry Behrman. His parents were emigrants from Germany. He was ethnically Jewish, but "knew little about his faith."  His parents brought him to New Orleans as an infant. He lived most of his life in the Algiers neighborhood, on the west bank of the Mississippi River.  As a young man he became affiliated with the Regular Democratic Organization, a powerful political faction in New Orleans, during the 1888 campaign of Francis T. Nicholls for governor of Louisiana.  Behrman served as a delegate to the Louisiana state constitutional convention in 1898.

Behrman eventually served as mayor for just under 17 years, first from 1904 to 1920.  After four consecutive terms he was defeated by reform candidate Andrew J. McShane. Behrman ran again in  1925 and won, serving from 1925 to 1926.  He died in New Orleans less than a year into his fifth term.

Books by or about Martin Behrman

Quotes
 "You can make it illegal, but you can't make it unpopular" (in reference to the closing of the Storyville district).

Places/things named after Martin Behrman
Behrman Avenue, New Orleans
Behrman Highway, New Orleans
Behrman Memorial Park, including Behrman Gym & Stadium, 2529 General Meyer Avenue, New Orleans
Behrman neighborhood in Algiers
Martin Behrman Avenue, Metairie, Louisiana
Martin Behrman Walk, Metairie, Louisiana
Martin Behrman Senior High School, whose faculty included State Senator Olaf Fink, later known as Martin Behrman Middle School, then Martin Behrman Elementary School, and finally Martin Behrman Charter School; 715 Opelousas Avenue, New Orleans
SS Martin Behrman, a World War II Liberty ship

References

1864 births
1926 deaths
American political bosses from Louisiana
Jewish mayors of places in the United States
Jewish American people in Louisiana politics
Louisiana Democrats
Mayors of New Orleans
Politicians from New York City